Stevens Point Area Senior High (commonly called SPASH) is a high school located in Stevens Point, Wisconsin, United States. It is part of the Stevens Point Area Public School District. SPASH serves the Stevens Point area, including Stevens Point, Plover, Whiting, and Park Ridge, as well as several towns and nearby Junction City and part of Milladore. The school mascot is a panther. The school opened in 1972, allowing the district high school to move from P. J. Jacobs which had housed the high school since 1938.

Notable alumni
 Kathi Bennett, NIU Huskies women's basketball head coach
 Cole Caufield, NHL forward
 Curt Clausen, Olympic race walker
 Rachel A. Graham, Wisconsin state court judge
 Suzy Favor-Hamilton, Olympic long-distance runner
 Sam Hauser, professional basketball player for the Boston Celtics
 Arthur L. Herman, popular historian
 Kathy Kinney, actress
 Julie Lassa, Wisconsin politician
 Janel McCarville, professional basketball player
 Louis Molepske, Wisconsin politician and judge
 William Murat, Wisconsin politician
 Joe Pavelski, NHL forward and 2010 Olympic silver medalist 
 Brandon Peterson, Marvel comic book artist
 Ben Provisor, Olympic Greco-Roman Wrestler
 Ryan Ramczyk, tackle, New Orleans Saints
 Rick Reichardt, major league baseball player
 Chris Solinsky, long-distance runner, former American record holder in the 10,000m run

References

External links
 Stevens Point Area Senior High website
 Stevens Point Area Public Schools homepage

Public high schools in Wisconsin
Stevens Point, Wisconsin
Schools in Portage County, Wisconsin